The Toronto Star is a Canadian English-language broadsheet daily newspaper. The newspaper is the country's largest daily newspaper by circulation. It is owned by Toronto Star Newspapers Limited, a subsidiary of Torstar Corporation and part of Torstar's Daily News Brands division.

The newspaper was established in 1892 as the Evening Star and was later renamed the Toronto Daily Star in 1900, under Joseph E. Atkinson. Atkinson was a major influence in shaping the editorial stance of the paper, with the paper reflecting his principles until his death in 1948. His son-in-law, Harry C. Hindmarsh, shared those principles as the paper's longtime managing editor while also helping to build circulation with sensational stories, bold headlines and dramatic photos. The paper was renamed the Toronto Star in 1971 and introduced a Sunday edition in 1977.

History
The Star was created in 1892 by striking Toronto News printers and writers, led by future mayor of Toronto and social reformer Horatio Clarence Hocken, who became the newspaper's founder, along with another future mayor, Jimmy Simpson.

The Star was first printed on Toronto World presses, and at its formation, The World owned a 51 percent interest in it as a silent partner. That arrangement only lasted for two months, during which time it was rumoured that William Findlay "Billy" Maclean, The Worlds proprietor, was considering selling the Star to the Riordon family. After an extensive fundraising campaign among the Star staff, Maclean agreed to sell his interest to Hocken.

The paper did poorly in its first few years. Hocken sold out within the year, and several owners followed in succession until railway entrepreneur William Mackenzie bought it in 1896. Its new editors, Edmund E. Sheppard and Frederic Thomas Nicholls, moved the entire Star operation into the same building used by the magazine Saturday Night.

Under Atkinson

Joseph E. "Holy Joe" Atkinson, backed by funds raised by supporters of Prime Minister Wilfrid Laurier, bought the paper on December 13, 1899. The supporters included Senator George Cox, William Mulock, Peter Charles Larkin and Timothy Eaton. Atkinson became the controlling shareholder of the Star. The Star was frequently criticized for practising the yellow journalism of its era. For decades, the paper included heavy doses of crime and sensationalism, along with advocating social change. 

Atkinson was the Stars editor from 1899 until his death in 1948. The newspaper's early opposition and criticism of the Nazi regime saw it become one of the first North American papers to be banned in Germany. Atkinson had a social conscience. He championed many causes that would come to be associated with the modern welfare state: old age pensions, unemployment insurance, and health care. The Government of Canada Digital Collections website describes Atkinson as:
a "radical" in the best sense of that term.... The Star was unique among North American newspapers in its consistent, ongoing advocacy of the interests of ordinary people. The friendship of Atkinson, the publisher, with Mackenzie King, the prime minister, was a major influence on the development of Canadian social policy.

Shortly before his death in 1948, Joseph E. Atkinson transferred ownership of the paper to a charitable organization given the mandate of continuing the paper's liberal tradition. In 1949, the Province of Ontario passed the Charitable Gifts Act, barring charitable organizations from owning large parts of profit-making businesses, that effectively required the Star to be sold.

Atkinson's will had directed that profits from the paper's operations were "for the promotion and maintenance of social, scientific and economic reforms which are charitable in nature, for the benefit of the people of the province of Ontario" and it stipulated that the paper could be sold only to people who shared his social views. The five trustees of the charitable organization circumvented the Act by buying the paper themselves and swearing before the Supreme Court of Ontario to continue what became known as the "Atkinson Principles":

 A strong, united and independent Canada
 Social justice
 Individual and civil liberties
 Community and civic engagement
 The rights of working people
 The necessary role of government

These principles continue to affect the Stars editorial stances. In February 2006, Star media columnist Antonia Zerbisias wrote on her blog:
Besides, we are the Star which means we all have the Atkinson Principles—and its multi-culti values—tattooed on our butts. Fine with me. At least we are upfront about our values, and they almost always work in favour of building a better Canada.

Other early media ventures
Under Atkinson, the Star launched several other media initiatives, including a weekend supplemental magazine, the Star Weekly, from 1910 to 1973. From 1922 to 1933, the Star was also a radio broadcaster on its station CFCA, broadcasting on a wavelength of 400 metres (749.48 kHz); its coverage was complementary to the paper's reporting. The station was closed following the establishment of the Canadian Radio Broadcasting Commission (CRBC) and the introduction of a government policy that, in essence, restricted private stations to an effective radiated power of 100 watts. The Star would continue to supply sponsored content to the CRBC's CRCT station—which later became CBC station CBL—an arrangement that lasted until 1946.

1971–present
In 1971, the newspaper was renamed The Toronto Star and moved to a modern International-style office tower at One Yonge Street by Queens Quay. The original Star building at 80 King Street West was demolished to make room for First Canadian Place. 

The Star expanded during the 1970s with the introduction of a Sunday edition in 1973 and a morning edition in 1981.

In 1992, its printing plant was moved to the Toronto Star Press Centre at the Highway 407 & 400 interchange in Vaughan. In September 2002, the logo was changed, and "The" was dropped from the masthead. During the 2003 Northeast blackout, the Star printed the paper at a press in Welland, Ontario. The newspaper's former printing plant was housed at One Yonge Street until the Toronto Star Press Centre opened.

Until the mid-2000s, the front page of the Toronto Star had no third-party advertising aside from upcoming lottery jackpot estimates from the Ontario Lottery and Gaming Corporation (OLG).

On May 28, 2007, the Star unveiled a redesigned paper that featured larger type, narrower pages, fewer and shorter articles, renamed sections, a more prominent focus on local news, and less focus on international news, columnists, and opinion pieces. However, on January 1, 2009, the Star reverted to its previous format. Star P.M., a free newspaper in PDF format that could be downloaded from the newspaper's website each weekday afternoon, was discontinued in October 2007, thirteen months after its launch.

On January 15, 2016, Torstar confirmed the closure of its Vaughan printing presses and indicated that it would outsource printing to Transcontinental Printing, leading to the layoff of all 285 staff at the plant, as Transcontinental had its own existing facility, also in Vaughan. The newspaper said the closure was effected so it could better focus on its digital outlets.
 
In February 2018, the Toronto Star suspended its internship program indefinitely to cut its costs. Long a source of Canada's next generation of journalists, the paid positions were seen as a vital part of the national industry, and their suspension, a sign of its continuing decline. In 2020, the internship program returned.

In April 2018, the Toronto Star expanded its local coverage of Vancouver, Calgary, Edmonton and Halifax with rebranded daily newspapers, previously known as Metro, as StarMetro, which was a joint venture between Torstar (90%) and Swedish media company Metro International (10%). In October 2018, the Toronto Star acquired iPolitics, a political news outlet.

On December 20, 2019, all StarMetro editions ceased publication amid the popularity and resultant growth of news apps on mobile devices. Local coverage once again became restricted to the Golden Horseshoe conurbation.

The newspaper was acquired by NordStar Capital on May 26, 2020, after the board of Torstar voted to sell the company to the investment firm for —making Torstar a privately held company. The deal was expected to be approved by Torstar's shareholders and to close by the end of 2020. Canadian Modern Media Holdings made an offer of $58million on July 9, 2020; NordStar subsequently increased its offer to $60million, effectively ending the bidding war. A vast majority of shareholders subsequently voted in favour of the deal. The takeover was approved by an Ontario judge on July 27, 2020. An appeal of the judgement by another prospective purchaser failed on July 31 when Ontario Superior Court Justice Michael Penny dismissed the motion. The deal was expected to close during the following week.

Content

Editorial position
Like its competitor The Globe and Mail, the Star covers "a spectrum of opinion that is best described as urban and Central Canadian" in character. The Star is generally centrist and centre-left, and is more socially liberal than The Globe and Mail. The paper has aligned itself over the years with the progressive "Atkinson principles" named for publisher Joseph E. Atkinson, who was editor and publisher of the paper for 50 years. These principles included social justice and social welfare provision, as well as individual rights and civil liberties. In 1984, scholar Wilfred H. Kesterton described the Star as "perpetually indignant" because of its social consciousness. When Atkinson's son Joseph Story Atkinson became president of the Star in 1957, he said, "From its inception in 1892, the Star has been a champion of social and economic reform, a defender of minority rights, a foe of discrimination, a friend of organized labour and a staunch advocate of Canadian nationhood."

Another of the "Atkinson principles" has been a "strong, united and independent Canada"; in a 1927 editorial, the paper wrote, "We believe in the British connection as much as anybody does but on a self-respecting basis of equality, of citizenship, and not on the old basis of one country belonging to the other." The paper was historically wary of American influence, and during the debates over the North American Free Trade Agreement, the paper was frequently critical of free trade and expressed concerns about Canadian sovereignty. The paper has been traditionally supportive of official bilingualism and maintaining Canadian unity in opposition to Quebec separatism.

In the 1980s, Michael Farber wrote in the Montreal Gazette that the Stars coverage was Toronto-centric to the point that any story was said to carry an explanation as to "What it means to Metro." Conversely, Canadian sociologist Elke Winter wrote in 2011 that the Toronto Star was less "Toronto-centric" than its rival, The Globe and Mail, writing that the Star "consciously reports for and from Canada's most multicultural city" and catered to a diverse readership.

The advent of the National Post in 1998 shook up the Toronto newspaper market. In the upheaval that followed, editorial spending increased and there was much turnover of editors and publishers.

Election endorsements
In the 50 years to 1972, the Star endorsed the Liberal Party in each federal general election. In the fifteen federal elections between 1968 and 2019, the Star has endorsed the Liberal Party eleven times, the New Democratic Party twice, and the Progressive Conservative Party twice.

Elections in which the Star did not endorse the Liberals took place in 1972 and 1974 (when it endorsed the Progressive Conservatives), and 1979 and 2011 (when it endorsed the NDP). In the 2011 election, the Star endorsed the NDP under Jack Layton, but to avoid vote splitting that could inadvertently help the Conservatives under Stephen Harper, which it saw as the worst outcome for the country, the paper also recommended Canadians vote strategically by voting for "the progressive candidate best placed to win" in certain ridings. For the 2015 election, the Star endorsed the Liberal Party under Justin Trudeau, and did so again in the 2019 federal election.

In Toronto's non-partisan mayoral elections, the Star endorsed George Smitherman in 2010 and John Tory in 2014 and 2018.

Features
The Star is one of the few Canadian newspapers that employs a "public editor" (ombudsman) and was the first to do so. Its newsroom policy and journalistic standards guide is also published online.

Other notable features include:
 optional supplements on Saturday and Sunday include Starweek (television listings and episode summaries), abridged version of The New York Times international section). Starweek and The New York Times supplements require separate additional payment)

The Star states that it favours an inclusive, "big tent" approach, not wishing to attract one group of readers at the expense of others. It publishes regular features on real estate (including condominiums), individual neighbourhoods (and street name etymologies), shopping, cooking, dining, alcoholic beverages (right down to having an exclusive on the anti-competitive practices of the Beer Store that led to major reforms on the sale of alcohol in Ontario grocery stores in 2015 by Premier Kathleen Wynne and Ed Clark), automobiles (as Wheels), and travel destinations.

Products

Website
The Star has maintained a website where it publishes its content since 1996. On October 2012, the Star announced its intention to implement a paywall on its website, thestar.com, which was made effective on August 13, 2013. Readers with daily home delivery had free access to all its digital content. Those without a digital subscription can view up to ten articles a month. The paywall does not apply to its sister sites, such as wheels.ca (automotive news and classifieds). However, during 2015, the Star announced that it would end its paywall, which it did on April 1, 2015. In June 2018, the Star announced it was implementing a paywall again.

Mobile app
On September 15, 2015, the Toronto Star released the Toronto Star Touch tablet app, which was a free interactive news app with interactive advertisements. It was discontinued in 2017. At launch, it was only available for the iPad, which uses iOS. Based on a similar app for Montreal-based La Presse released in 2013, Star Touch is the first such app for any English-language news organization, quality-wise. In slightly over 50 days since launch, the app had reached the 100,000-download milestone. The Android version was launched on December 1, 2015. The iOS version is rated 12+ by Apple's App Store guidelines and the Android version is rated Mature 17+ by the Entertainment Software Rating Board (ESRB).

Circulation

The Toronto Star has seen, like most Canadian daily newspapers, a decline in circulation. Its total circulation dropped by  percent to 318,763 copies daily from 2009 to 2015.

Offices

The Toronto Star has been located at several addresses since 1892.

 1892: 83 Yonge Street (shared with The Toronto World)
 1896: 26–28 Adelaide Street West
 1905: 18–20 King Street West
 1929: 80 King Street West (Old Toronto Star Building)
 1970: One Yonge Street
 The Star will be relocating to 410 Front Street West in 2022.

Notable staff

Publishers

 Joseph E. Atkinson (1899–1948)
 Joseph S. Atkinson (1948–1966)
 Beland Honderich (1966–1988)
 David R. Jolley (1988–1994)
 John Honderich (1995–2004)
 Michael Goldbloom (2004–2006)
 Jagoda Pike (2006–2008)
 Donald Babick (2008)
 John Cruickshank (2009–2016)
 John Boynton (2017–2020)
 Jordan L. Bitove (since 2020)

Journalists and columnists

 Pierre Berton
 Tony Burman
 Morley Callaghan
 June Callwood
 Greg Clark
 Jeremy Clarkson
 Erin Combs
 Daniel Dale
 Susan Delacourt
 Rosie DiManno
 Robyn Doolittle
 Milt Dunnell
 Joe Fiorito
 Graham Fraser
 Michael Geist
 Carol Goar
 Alison Gordon
 Richard Gwyn
 Matthew Halton
 Tom Harpur
 Chantal Hébert
 Ernest Hemingway
 W. A. Hewitt
 Kim Hughes
 Cathal Kelly
 Marc and Craig Kielburger
 Naomi Klein
 Faisal Kutty
 Michele Landsberg
 Gary Lautens
 Duncan Macpherson
 Linda McQuaig
 Earl McRae
 Heather Mallick
 Lou Marsh
 Peter C. Newman
 Cleo Paskal
 Angelo Persichilli
 Jim Proudfoot
 Ben Rayner
 Ellen Roseman
 Robert Service
 Haroon Siddiqui
 Gordon Sinclair
 Randy Starkman
 Walter Stewart
 Tanya Talaga
 Charles Templeton
 Ellie Tesher
 James Travers
 Thomas Walkom
 Claire Wallace
 Antonia Zerbisias

Cartoonists

 Walter Ball
 Sid Barron
 Jimmy Frise
 Duncan Macpherson
 Dušan Petričić
 Ben Wicks

See also

 Grant v Torstar Corp
 Media in Canada
 List of media outlets in Toronto
 List of newspapers in Canada
 List of the largest Canadian newspapers by circulation

Notes

References

Further reading

External links

 
Toronto Star – The Canadian Encyclopedia
Toronto Star – Encyclopædia Britannica
Toronto Star photograph archive – Toronto Public Library

 
1892 establishments in Ontario
Daily newspapers published in Ontario
Newspapers published in Toronto
Publications established in 1892
Torstar publications